The American Council of Christian Churches(ACCC) is a fundamentalist organization set up in opposition to the Federal Council of Churches (now National Council of Churches).

The council's motto is Jude 3, "Earnestly contending for the Faith".

History
ACCC was founded in 1941 under the leadership of Carl McIntire.

Membership in the American Council of Christian Churches is available to denominations and individual Christians, who are admitted by a 3/4 majority vote. Agreement with the purposes and doctrinal statement are required and membership is specifically denied to those who have affiliations with 

The ACCC has remained small in comparison to the National Association of Evangelicals and the National Council of Churches. This is due in part to its strong separatist stance, and in part because separatist denominations will often not participate in "cross-denominational" organizations.

Ralph Colas currently serves as Executive Secretary. Offices are in Bethlehem, Pennsylvania. The ACCC is the national equivalent of the International Council of Christian Churches.

In July 2007, the leadership of the ACCC issued a statement criticizing a recent declaration by the Congregation for the Doctrine of the Faith on the meaning of the phrase subsistit in which re-emphasized the role of the Catholic Church as the subsisting Church of Christ.

Members – April 2019
 Appalachian Independent Minister’s Fellowship
 Association of Ministers of the Reformed Faith
 Faith Presbytery, Bible Presbyterian Church
 Evangelical Methodist Church of America
 Fellowship of Fundamental Bible Churches
 Free Presbyterian Church of North America
 Fundamental Methodist Church
 Independent Baptist Fellowship of North America
 Independent Churches Affiliated

Presidents
 Clyde J. Kennedy (1958–1961)

References

External links
 

Christian fundamentalism
United States
Christian organizations established in 1941